The Bangladesh Journal of Pharmacology is a quarterly peer-reviewed scientific journal published by the Bangladesh Pharmacological Society. The journal covers research on regulatory mechanisms that affect drug development and utilization, and medical education. Video component of the methodology is also added. The editor-in-chief is Mir Misbahuddin MBBS, PhD.

Abstracting and indexing 
The journal is abstracted and indexed in:

According to the Journal Citation Reports, the journal has a 2021 impact factor of 1.143.

References

External links 
 

Pharmacology journals
English-language journals
Quarterly journals
Open access journals
Publications established in 2006